Charles Denner (29 May 1926 – 10 September 1995) was a French actor born to a Jewish family in Tarnów, Poland. During his 30-year career he worked with some of France's greatest  directors of the time, including Louis Malle, Claude Chabrol, Jean-Luc Godard, Costa-Gavras, Claude Lelouch and François Truffaut, who gave him two of his most memorable roles, as Fergus in The Bride Wore Black (1968) and as Bertrand Morane in The Man Who Loved Women (1977).

Early life
Charles Denner was born in 1926 in the city of Tarnów in south-eastern Poland, before emigrating with his family to France at the age of four. During World War II, his family took refuge in Brive-la-Gaillarde, where they were helped by Rabbi David Feuerwerker. Also during the war, Denner was a Free French partisan in the Vercors mountains and destroyed a Nazi SS truck with a grenade; he was wounded and later received the Croix de Guerre for this operation. Passionate about theatre from his childhood, Denner became a student of Charles Dullin, a famous theatre teacher of his time, under whose guidance he remained until 1945. Another great personality of French theatre, Jean Vilar, impressed by Denner's performance at Les mamelles de Tirésias (The Breasts of Tiresias) called him four years after he left Vilar to join the Théâtre National Populaire (TNP). It was there that he gave some of his earliest stage performances in plays such as Heinrich von Kleist's Prinz Friedrich von Homburg and Alfred de Musset's Lorenzaccio, among others.

Career
In 1955, director Yves Allégret offered Denner a small role in La Meilleure part (The Best Part), thus introducing him for the first time to cinema audiences. Two years later, in 1957, he secured another secondary role in  Louis Malle's legendary Elevator to the Gallows, alongside Jeanne Moreau, a co-performer of his from the days of the TNP; however, it was not until 1963 that Denner was offered his first leading role by Claude Chabrol in Landru, a film considered by many as his greatest on-screen performance. Despite his growing recognition on the big screen, the stage remained his true passion and the place where he gave his most memorable performances in plays like Molière's Les Fourberies de Scapin (Scapin's Schemings) and Brecht's Drums in the Night.

Death

On 10 September 1995 Denner died of pneumonia in Dreux, France.

Filmography

References

External links

Charles Denner - All Things Denner 

1926 births
1995 deaths
20th-century Polish Jews
Deaths from pneumonia in France
20th-century French male actors
French male stage actors
French male film actors
People from Tarnów
People from Eure-et-Loir
Polish emigrants to France
Recipients of the Croix de Guerre 1939–1945 (France)